À Beira do Caminho is a 2012 Brazilian drama film directed by Breno Silveira, starring João Miguel, Ângelo Antônio, Dira Paes, Vinícius Nascimento, and Ludmila Rosa.
The title of the film is a reference to the 1969 popular song "Sentado à Beira do Caminho" by Erasmo Carlos.

Plot
João, a truck driver, leaves his hometown and travels across the country. On one of his trips, he discovers a boy, Duda, hidden in his truck; the child, who has no mother, is in search of his father. João reluctantly agrees to take him to the nearest city, and ends up forming a friendship with him.

Cast and characters
 João Miguel as João
 Vinícius Nascimento as Duda
 Ângelo Antônio as Afonso
 Dira Paes as Rosa
 Ludmila Rosa as Helena

Reviews
The film received mixed reviews. Several critics pointed out similarities with Silveira's 2005 feature Two Sons of Francisco.

References

External links
 

2012 films
2010s Portuguese-language films
2012 drama films
Brazilian drama films